Peter Rubino (born 1947) is an American master sculptor.

Early life and education

Peter Rubin was born in 1947 in Brooklyn, New York.
His formal art training was at the National Academy of Design and the Art Students League in Manhattan, New York

Commissioned busts 

He has created likenesses of such notables as: American actor, David Canary; American jazz pianist, Dave Brubeck; the leader of the Trinidad and Tobago Teachers Union (TTTU), St. Elmo Gopaul; and NYPD Police officer and hero, Kenneth Hansen of the 61st Precinct, Brooklyn, New York.

The partnership 

Forming a business partnership "Rudolf-Rubino Creations", with former U.S. Senator Jack Rudolph he created busts of Babe Ruth, Ty Cobb, Lawrence Taylor, Don Mattingly, Mickey Mantle and Lou Gehrig. Former General Manager of the New York Rangers, Phil Esposito, commissioned the partnership to create a figure of the goalie Eddie Giacomin, and it was presented to him when his jersey number was retired.

They met and became friends at the Silvermine Artists Guild, in New Canaan. Mr. Rudolf decided that he would take care of the business details while Mr. Rubino produced the heroic sculptures envisioned.

Monuments 
His abstract commissions include: in 1983 an 11-foot work entitled, "Mother of All Life," at the Boyko Research Center at Ben Gurion University in Beer Sheva, Israel; in 1991 a 7-foot sculpture entitled, "Eagle" depicting a boy in the Eagle Scout uniform; and in 1997 a 35-foot monumental entitled, "Angel" created for The Walt Disney Company.

Publications 

"The Portrait in Clay" which is distributed world wide by Random House (Watson Guptill) and has been translated into Russian and Chinese.

"Sculpting the Figure in Clay", An Artistic and Technical Journey to Understanding the Creative and Dynamic Forces in Figurative Sculpture (Watson-Guptill Publications, $32.50, April 27, 2010), foreword written by jazz icon Dave Brubeck. It is a comprehensive instructional guide to sculpting the human figure in clay, meant to simulate the classroom experience. This all-inclusive volume lays out an easy-to-follow, step-by-step method of blocking out the plane structure and anatomy of the posed figure. His unique approach utilizes a geometric system consisting of blocks, simple shapes, and guidelines, which instructs students with new and instinctive sculptural insight. Sculptural concepts are illustrated through a sequence of dramatic photos of the model, taken from every angle in a given pose, and the entire sculpting process is shown from start to finish, with accompanying text. The unique approach covered in this book, including overlays and many photographic reference poses for continued study, will define a fresh and spirited sculptural language enabling artists to create expressive figures with individual style.

Teaching career 

He has taught the art of sculpting for over thirty-five years.  He was an instructor at The Brooklyn Museum Art School, the Silvermine Artists Guild, The National Academy School of Fine Art in New York City.

He teaches annual workshops in the United States and Italy.

He also conducts workshops at the Scottsdale Artists' School in Arizona.

Videos 

Mr. Rubino has produced several performance videos demonstrating his art of sculpting: "Symphony in Clay", "Symphony in Clay II", "Extreme Sculpting", "Extreme Sculpting Gone Wild", "Sculpting the Female Torso", "Making of a President", "Peter Rubino Portrait Sculpture Evolution"  and "aWARness".

Workshops

2012

Covert Clay Studio, AZ
Tuscan Renaissance Center, Italy
Armory Art Center, West Palm Beach Florida

2011

Mystic Art Center, Mystic, CT
National Academy School of Fine Art, NYC
Brookgreen Gardens, SC
Tuscan Renaissance Center, Italy
Covert Clay Studio, AZ

Exhibitions 

8/23/2012 - Silvermine Arts Center - Faculty Exhibition

References 

1947 births
Living people
American artists
American people of Italian descent